Matthew "Matt" Breen (born 12 June 1976) is a former professional tennis player from Australia.

Career
Breen, who played collegiate tennis for the UCLA Bruins, was a boys' doubles quarter-finalist in the 1993 Australian Open. He matched that performance at the same tournament a year later and also made the singles quarter-finals. With his partner from those events, Lee Pearson, Breen won the doubles title at the Victorian Junior Championship in 1994.

In the 2001 Australian Open, Breen competed in both the singles and men's doubles. He lost his singles match to Cecil Mamiit in five sets and also exited in the first round of the doubles, partnering Pearson.

Challenger titles

Doubles: (1)

References

1976 births
Living people
Australian male tennis players
Tennis people from Victoria (Australia)
UCLA Bruins men's tennis players